Route 315, also known as Wood Islands Road, is a , two-lane, uncontrolled-access, local highway in Prince Edward Island. Its southern terminus is at Route 1 in Wood Islands, and its northern terminus is at Route 4 in Montague. It generally forms a straight line between the termini. The route is in Queens and Kings counties.

References

315
315
Prince Edward Island provincial highways